Hồ is a Vietnamese surname. The name is transliterated as Hu in Chinese and Ho in Korean.

Ho is the anglicized variation of the surname Hồ. Not be confused with Ho surname in Vietnamese.

The Hồ 胡 clan which founded the Hồ dynasty in Vietnam originated in Zhejiang province of China.

Notable people with the surname Hồ
Ho Chi Minh (1890–1969), Vietnamese Communist leader
Hồ Xuân Hương (1772–1822), Vietnamese poet
Hồ dynasty (1400–1406), rulers of Dai Viet
Hồ Quý Ly (1336–1407?), ruler of Dai Viet
Hồ Hán Thương (died 1407?), ruler of Dai Viet
 Hồ Lệ Thu (born 1973), Vietnamese pop singer
 Hồ Ngọc Hà (born 1984), Vietnamese model, pop singer, actress, and entertainer
 Don Hồ (born 1970), Vietnamese–American pop singer
 Hồ Thành Việt (1955–2003), Vietnamese–American computer entrepreneur

See also
 Hồ (disambiguation)

References

Vietnamese-language surnames

vi:Hồ (họ)